State Route 211 (SR 211) is a primary state highway in the U.S. state of Virginia. The state highway runs  from SR 42 in Timberville east to Interstate 81 (I-81) and U.S. Route 211 (US 211) in New Market. SR 211 is a state-numbered westward extension of US 211.

Route description

SR 211 begins at an intersection with SR 42 (Main Street) in the town of Timberville. The state highway heads east as two-lane undivided New Market Road, which parallels the North Fork Shenandoah River to the south. SR 211 crosses the Rockingham–Shenandoah county line and continues as Old Cross Road. The state highway passes to the south of New Market Airport and veers away from the river before meeting the southern end of SR 305 (George Collins Parkway), which provides access to the New Market Battlefield, which commemorates the Civil War Battle of New Market. Just east of SR 305, SR 211 reaches its eastern terminus at its diamond interchange with I-81. Old Cross Road continues east as US 211, which passes through New Market before heading toward Luray and Warrenton.

Major intersections

References

External links

Virginia Highways Project: VA 211

211
State Route 211
State Route 211